The Zionist Federation of Great Britain and Ireland, also known as the British Zionist Federation or simply the Zionist Federation (ZF), is an umbrella organisation for the Zionist movement in the United Kingdom, representing more than 30 organisations and over 50,000 affiliated members. It was established in 1899 to campaign for a permanent homeland for the Jewish people.

History

The organisation was established in 1899 to campaign for a permanent homeland for the Jewish people.

In 1917, the British Foreign Secretary Sir Arthur Balfour communicated the Balfour Declaration to the leader of United Kingdom's Jewish community Lord Rothschild for transmission to the Zionist Federation.

In 1920, the Zionist Federation founded Women's International Zionist Organization (WIZO) and Keren Hayesod. The ZF also founded a number of Zionist youth movements.

Aims and objectives
It describes itself as "the UK's leading Israel advocacy and grassroots organisation" which "celebrates Israel and challenges our enemies."

Among its aims and objectives are to:

Support, co-ordinate and facilitate the work of all its affiliates nationwide, and to continue its commitment to the Zionist youth movements.
Encourage the participation of Jews in Zionist activities, including education, culture, Hebrew language and Israel information, underpinned by the belief that the main goal of Zionism is Aliyah.

Activities
Activities include: training, campaigning, media engagement, lobbying, combatting the BDS movement, working with students and cultural events.

Structure and personnel
The Zionist Federation is an umbrella organisation encompassing most of the Zionist organizations and individuals in the country and, as such, represents the Zionist movement in the United Kingdom.

As of October 2012, the chairman is Paul Charney.

See also
David Lindo Alexander
Federation of Zionist Youth
Habonim Dror
Jewish Labour Movement
Israel lobby in the United Kingdom

References

External links

Official profiles, on YouTube and Twitter
Zionist Year Book, by Arthur Saul and Zionist Federation Of Great Britain and Ireland Super 

1899 establishments in the United Kingdom
Jewish lobbying
Organizations established in 1899
Zionism in the United Kingdom
Zionist organizations